Old Bath is an unincorporated community in Bath Township, Franklin County, Indiana.

History
Bath was platted in 1815. It was named from Bath Township. When New Bath was founded on the railroad in 1903, Bath became Old Bath.

Geography

References

Unincorporated communities in Franklin County, Indiana
Unincorporated communities in Indiana